The Tom Lantos Block Burmese JADE (Junta's Anti-Democratic Efforts) Act of 2008 is a United States act of Congress, that bars gemstones -- specifically rubies and jadeite -- from Burma from entering the United States via third party countries.

Provisions
, gemstones are Burma's third largest source of income.

The bill also bars generals and their associates in Burma from acquiring visas to enter the United States and increases financial sanctions against the Burmese government. The ban does not apply to gems imported for personal use nor to exports of Burmese gems from the U.S or prevent U.S. sales of Burmese gems already in the United States.

Name
The Act was named for Tom Lantos, former chairman of the House Foreign Affairs Committee.

External links 
 White House Press Release, (video of signing)
 Bush Signs Burmese Gemstone Import Ban into Law (IDEX Online)
 Bush signs sanctions against Myanmar into law (AFP via Google)
 US extends Myanmar sanctions (Al Jazeera English)

United States foreign relations legislation
United States federal trade legislation
Acts of the 110th United States Congress
2008 in international relations 
Myanmar–United States relations